Abushkovo is a rural locality (a village) in Lotoshino Urban Settlement of Lotoshinsky District, Moscow Oblast, Russia. The population was 1 .

Geography 
The village is located on the left bank of the Russa River, 11 km northwest of Lotoshino (the district's administrative centre) by road. Kalitsino is the nearest rural locality.

References 

Rural localities in Moscow Oblast